Syed Zeeshan Haider Jawadi (17 September 1938 – 15 April 2000) was an Indian Islamic scholar, religious leader, public speaker, Qur'anic interpreter, Urdu poet, historian and philosopher of Shia Islam.

Biography 
Syed Zeeshan Haider Jawadi (also known as Allama Jawadi) was born in Allahabad on 17 September 1938 in town Karari, Dist. Allahabad (now Karari, Dist. Kaushambi, Uttar Pradesh, India.) . He started his primary education at Jamia Amjadia Karari, Allahabad and continued his Islamic education at Jamia Nazmia in Lucknow and after finishing his studies there, Allama Jawadi moved to Najaf-e-Ashraf (Iraq) for higher studies, as Najaf was the best Islamic learning center of that time and he stayed under the patronage of his brother Maulana Syed Ali Abid Rizvi until 1961. Muhammad Baqir al-Sadr taught him Islamic philosophy and other Islamic sciences.

He was dean of the India Shi'ite elementary and theological schools, which numbered 40 in 1993.

He died at the age of 62 on 15 April 2000.

Personal life
Jawadi's son, Ehsan Jawadi, a Shia scholar who regularly presented on the Win Islam TV channel, died in 2018.

Works 
 Anwar Al-Quran (Translation and Commentary on Quran)
 Women and Shari'at (Divine Law): Complete Rules Regarding Women, in Islam (1999)
Nahj Al-Balagha (Translation and commentary)
Al-Sahifa al-Sajjadiyya (Translation)
Iqtisaduna (Translation)
Al-Bank al-Ribawii al-Islam
Imam Jafer Sadiq(as) aur mazahib e Arbaa  (Urdu:امام جعفر صادقؑ اور مذایبِ اربعہ)
Ahl Al-Bait - Quran aur Sunnat ki raushni mein (Translation)
Nuqoosh e Ismat 
Life sketch of fourteen infallibles (English translation of Nuqoosh e Ismat)
MiraturRashad (Translation of Wasiyatnama, Last Will & Testament By Ayatullah Shaikh Abdulla Mamkani)
Karbala Shenasi (Compilation of Speeches given in London)
Mehfil o Majalis

References

1938 births
2000 deaths
Indian Muslim scholars of Islam
People from Allahabad
Indian Shia Muslims
Indian poets
Islamic philosophers